TCT is a Finnish band consisting of T.L., Comeetta and Tiahu. Their music has been described as "party-hop"; it's pop music mixed with elements of funk and hip hop. TCT was signed to Universal Music Finland in June 2013. Their first single "Rannalle" peaked at number five on the Finnish Singles Chart. The band released their debut album IOJK (IhanOmaJuttuKäynnis) on 21 August 2015.

Discography

Albums

Singles

References

External links
Official website

Finnish pop music groups